Standesamt Kolmar was a civil registration district (Standesamt) located in Kreis Kolmar, province of Posen of the German Empire (1871–1918) and administered the communities of:

Kol (S) = Kolmar (town); Kol (L) = Kolmar (rural area); Usc = Usch
Population data may be inaccurate (see German census of 1895).

The area around Kolmar was hilly and forested, sometimes called the "Switzerland of Posen".  Three lakes surround the town.  The Standesamt region also included the area north of the hills, encompassing the Netze river farming communities.  This area probably contains the greatest elevation difference of the entire province, from about 200 meters above sea level to about 40 meters.

The area was a major crossroads for both vehicle and rail.  The railroad from Posen to Schneidemühl passed through Kolmer north/south and a line branched off to the east along the river bluff and then dipped south to Margonin, then back east to Gollantsh and points east.  Major roads followed the same routes, except the east road continued along the bluff to Samotschin, and it had a western route, towards Czarnikau.

Like many other Posen communities, weaving was a major cottage industry until tariffs and industrialization made it unprofitable.  A substantial ceramics (especially majolica) factory operated northwest of Kolmar for many years.

External links 
Rattai
Majolica artist Gerda Conitz was born in Studsin, 1901

Civil registration offices in the Province of Posen